William A. Hawley (August 19, 1824January 15, 1873) was a career United States Army officer, who served in the Mexican–American War and the American Civil War.  During the Civil War, he commanded the 3rd Wisconsin Infantry Regiment and received an honorary brevet to the rank of brigadier general.

Biography
Hawley was born on August 19, 1824, in Porter, New York. He lived in Lockport, New York, before moving to Madison, Wisconsin, in 1854.

Career
Hawley originally served in the United States Army during the Mexican–American War, where he achieved the rank of sergeant.  He was discharged after the end of the war. After the outbreak of the American Civil War, Hawley was commissioned an officer in the Union Army and helped to organized the 3rd Wisconsin Infantry Regiment. The following year, he was promoted to Lieutenant Colonel and Colonel the year after that, at which time he took command of the regiment. Under Hawley's command, the regiment participated in the Battle of Chancellorsville, the Battle of Gettysburg, the Atlanta Campaign, Sherman's March to the Sea, and the Carolinas Campaign.

Hawley was mustered out of the volunteers on July 18, 1865. On January 13, 1866, President Andrew Johnson nominated Hawley for appointment to the grade of brevet brigadier general of volunteers to rank from March 16, 1865, for gallant services in the campaigns in Georgia and South Carolina, and the United States Senate confirmed the appointment on March 12, 1866.

Following the war and his discharge in July 1865, Hawley left the army for a time. In May 1866, he re-joined the U.S. Army as a second lieutenant in the 11th U.S. Infantry Regiment and was stationed in Virginia that year.  On September 21, 1866, he was transferred to the 20th U.S. Infantry Regiment.  Hawley was promoted to first lieutenant on December 6, 1866.

On January 15, 1873, Hawley died in Buffalo, New York, after falling ill during a blizzard. William Hawley was buried in Glenwood Cemetery, Flint, Michigan.

References

Further reading

External links

|-

|-

People from Porter, New York
People from Lockport, New York
Military personnel from Madison, Wisconsin
People of Wisconsin in the American Civil War
Union Army colonels
American military personnel of the Mexican–American War
United States Army soldiers
1824 births
1873 deaths